Wheeling High School, or WHS, is a public four-year high school located in Wheeling, Illinois, a northwest suburb of Chicago, Illinois, in the United States. It is part of Township High School District 214, which also includes Buffalo Grove High School, Elk Grove High School, John Hersey High School, Prospect High School, and Rolling Meadows High School. The school serves the communities of Wheeling, Prospect Heights, Arlington Heights, Buffalo Grove and Mount Prospect. U.S. News & World Report ranked WHS as the 6th high school in District 214, the 90th high school in Illinois, and as the 2,448th high school in the United States in 2019.

Feeder schools
Feeder schools include London Middle School, Holmes Middle School, MacArthur Middle School. Some students from nearby private schools, such as St. Alphonsus Liguori, Saint Emily's Catholic School, St. Mary's School, and St. James, matriculate to WHS, too.

History
Wheeling High School (WHS) first opened in 1964. The class of 1966 was the first graduating class from Wheeling High School. As of 2009, it has a total enrollment of 1,869 students and a 98.8% parent involvement rate. The average class size is 19.9 students for every one teacher. The current principal is Dr. Bradford Hubbard. WHS's school colors are blue, gold, and white, and the mascot is Willie the Wildcat. During the 2010–2011 school year, WHS was due to get their name changed to Wheeling High School Math, Science, Technology Academy and add the STEM (science, technology, engineering, and math) program to the school, but after several debates about the topic, the board of education and superintendent decided not to change the name of the school.

Academics

As of 2013, Wheeling High School boasts a 90% graduation rate and a mere 2.6% dropout rate. Wheeling High School graduates have been accepted to highly selective postgraduate options, such as United States Naval Academy, Harvard University, Yale University, Princeton University, Brown University, Northwestern University, The University of Chicago, University of Notre Dame, Georgetown University, Boston College, The United States Military Academy at West Point, New York University, Georgia Institute of Technology, and Tulane University. Approximately 85% of Wheeling High School certified staff holds a degree at or above the master's degree level.

Wheeling High School offers over 215 different courses, 22 of which are at the AP level. The academic departments at Wheeling High School are grouped as follows: math/science, career and technology education, English/fine arts, PE/health/dance/drivers' education, foreign language/social studies/ESL/ELL, NJROTC, and special education. The following AP courses are offered at Wheeling High School: Language & Composition, Literature & Composition, Calculus AB, Calculus BC, Statistics, Computer Science, Physics, Chemistry, Biology, Environmental Science, Spanish Language & Culture, Spanish Literature & Culture, French Language & Culture, Italian Language & Culture, Human Geography, World History, United States History, Government & Politics, Psychology, Economics, Studio Art, and Music Theory.

Wheeling's class of 2017's average ACT score was 21, placing it lower than District 214's average score of 23 and equal to Illinois' average score of 21. In terms of subject proficiency, only 42% of WHS students are proficient in math, and 43% are proficient in reading. These proficiency scores are lower than every school in District 214 aside from Elk Grove High School.

Athletics
Wheeling High School competes in the Mid-Suburban League (MSL) East Division.  Wheeling is also a member of the Illinois High School Association (IHSA), which governs most of the interscholastic sports and competitive activities in Illinois.  Wheeling High School teams are stylized as the Wildcats.

The school sponsors interscholastic sports teams for young men and women in basketball, cross country, golf, soccer, swimming & diving, tennis, track & field, volleyball, and water polo. Young men may compete in baseball, football, and wrestling, while young women may compete in bowling, cheerleading, gymnastics, badminton and softball.

The girls' cross-country teams won IHSA state championships in 1979–80, 1983–84, 1984–85, and 1986–87. The boys' cross-country team won a state championship in 1998–99.

Activities
Wheeling HS sponsors 61 clubs and activities for students, ranging from the arts and literature to cultural and community service.  The list can change from year to year, but can be found at this site.

Among the activities are chapters or affiliates with the following national organizations: DECA, SADD, Science Olympiad, and the National Honor Society.

WildStang is a robotics team composed of students from Rolling Meadows High School, Prospect High School and Wheeling High School. The team, partnering with Motorola, won the 2006 Championship Chairman's Award at the FIRST Championship Event. WildStang has also won the FIRST Championship Event in 2003 with team 469 from Bloomfield Hills, Michigan and team 65 from Pontiac, Michigan. WildStang went undefeated and won the 2009 FIRST Championships with team 67 of Milford, Michigan, and team 971 from Mountain View, California. Wildstang won the 2011 FIRST Championships with team 254 and Team 973. The WildStang FTC team, "MiniStang", has won the 2007, 2008, and 2009 Illinois State Championship with an undefeated record.

Wheeling High School's congressional debate team is also one of its most prominent clubs. The team has won 10 out of the last 15 ICDA state titles; in that period, no other school has won more than once. The team had long been coached by Mike Hurley, English teacher.

Another prominent club at Wheeling High School is its Orchesis team. The team has gone to the National High School Dance Festival 4 times in the last 8 years. Wheeling High School's Orchesis team has also gone to state several times in its history. Orchesis sponsor is Diane Rawlison, dance teacher and recipient of the 2014 Ruth Page Award.

Notable alumni
 Michael R. Blanchfield (1967), a U.S. Army Specialist 4; during a tour of duty in Vietnam, he was killed after throwing himself on an enemy grenade and received Medal of Honor
 Charlie Kirk, founder of Turning Point USA
 Tommy McManus, former linebacker for NFL's Jacksonville Jaguars (1995–96, 1998–99)
 Mark Newman (1966), executive with baseball's New York Yankees
 Philip Ng (1994), Hong Kong-born American actor, martial artist and action choreographer
 Joseph G. Peterson (1983), novelist and poet
 Haley Reinhart (2009), singer, songwriter and voice actress, American Idol finalist
 Bren Spillane (2015), baseball player for the Cincinnati Reds

References

Wheeling, Illinois
Public high schools in Cook County, Illinois
1964 establishments in Illinois
Educational institutions established in 1964